Lowland Heights is a hamlet in southern Alberta, Canada within the Municipal District of Pincher Creek No. 9.

History
Lowland heights is recognized for being a valuable point of transportation between Pincher Creek and Fort Macleod in the late 1800s.

Demographics 

See also 
List of communities in Alberta
List of designated places in Alberta
List of hamlets in Alberta

References 

Hamlets in Alberta
Designated places in Alberta
Municipal District of Pincher Creek No. 9